Russell Ball (24 March 1891 – 12 June 1942) was a studio glamour photographer who made stills for films and portraits of Hollywood film stars including Jean Harlow, Greta Garbo, Louise Brooks, Mary Pickford, Esther Ralston and Carol Dempster.

Life

Russell Earp Ball was born in Philadelphia. His father died while Russell was still a teenager; by 1910 Russell was working as a salesman for the Gas Light Manufacturing Company. He moved to New York and on 1 February 1912 he married the film journalist Gladys Hall, with whom he had two children, while working as a newspaper photographer. By 1917 he was working as a photographer, and by 1920 he had specialised into making portrait publicity stills for films, among others for the Shubert Organization. After working independently for Metro-Goldwyn-Mayer in 1925 (on the East Coast), he opened his own studio at 9528 Brighton Way, Beverly Hills to work for private patrons and celebrities at the end of the 1920s.

References

Further reading

 

1891 births
1942 deaths
20th-century American photographers
Photographers from California